Buddies is a 10" split album by British folk punk artist Frank Turner and American alternative country artist Jon Snodgrass, that was written in four hours and was recorded the next day in early August 2010. The 10" vinyl was released in the UK in September 2010 and due to popular demand, it was released as a digital download on iTunes on 28 January 2011.

Track listing

2010 EPs
Frank Turner albums
Split EPs